Glen de Vries (June 29, 1972 – November 11, 2021) was an American entrepreneur in the field of medical science and pharmacology. He was the co-founder and co-CEO of Medidata Solutions.

Early life and education
De Vries grew up in New York and showed a passion for computers and science at a young age. He attended the Ethical Culture Fieldston School in Manhattan and the Bronx, NY.  His mother encouraged him to learn ballroom dancing in high school, and he danced competitively with her. De Vries attended Carnegie Mellon University and graduated in 1994. He taught himself to speak Japanese.

De Vries received his undergraduate degree in molecular biology and genetics from Carnegie Mellon University, worked as a research scientist at the Columbia Presbyterian Medical Center, and studied computer science at New York University's Courant Institute of Mathematics.

De Vries is the author, with Jeremy Blachman, of the 2020 book The Patient Equation: The Precision Medicine Revolution in the Age of COVID-19 and Beyond, about the use of data in the future of medicine.

Blue Origin flight 
On October 13, 2021, de Vries accompanied actor William Shatner and two tourists on a New Shepard launch vehicle as part of the Blue Origin NS-18 suborbital flight into outer space.

Death 
De Vries was killed in a small plane crash involving a Cessna 172 in a heavily wooded area outside Hampton Township, New Jersey, on November 11, 2021, at the age of 49. He was a certified private pilot with an instrument rating. The plane's other occupant, Thomas Fischer, also died in the crash.

As a tribute, his initials were added to the mission patch of Blue Origin's crewed flight Blue Origin NS-19, which took place on December 11, 2021.

References 

1972 births
2021 deaths
Accidental deaths in New Jersey
Aviators killed in aviation accidents or incidents in the United States
Businesspeople from New York (state)
Carnegie Mellon University alumni
People who have flown in suborbital spaceflight
Victims of aviation accidents or incidents in 2021
New Shepard passengers
Space tourists